Lyconodes argenteus is a species of merluccid hake so far known only from the southeast Atlantic Ocean near to South Africa.

References
 

Merlucciidae
Monotypic fish genera
Fish described in 1922